Jackielou Buntan (born July 2, 1997) is a Filipino-American muay thai kickboxer, currently competing in the strawweight division of ONE Championship, where she is a one-time Women's Muay Thai Strawweight World Championship title challenger.

Martial arts career
Buntan made her ONE Championship debut against Wondergirl Fairtex at ONE Championship: Fists Of Fury on February 26, 2021. She won the fight by unanimous decision. Buntan scored the sole knockdown of the fight in the opening seconds of the first round, as she dropped Wondergirl with a left hook. It was later revealed that Wondergirl had suffered two facial fractures and double vision as result of that knockdown.

Buntan faced Ekaterina Vandaryeva at ONE Championship: Full Blast on April 28, 2021. She won the fight by majority decision.

Buntan faced Daniela López at ONE Championship: Empower on September 3, 2021. She won the fight by unanimous decision.

Her three-fight winning streak under the ONE banner earned Buntan the chance to fight Smilla Sundell for the inaugural ONE Women's Strawweight Muay Thai World Championship at ONE 156 on April 22, 2022. Despite a strong start to the bout, she lost the fight by unanimous decision.

Buntan faced Amber Kitchen on December 3, 2022, at ONE on Prime Video 5. At the weigh-ins, Buntan weighed in at 130 pounds, 5 pounds over the strawweight limit and was fined 20% of her purse, which went to her opponent. She won the fight by unanimous decision.

Buntan is scheduled to face Diandra Martin on May 5, 2023, at ONE Fight Night 10.

Fight record

|-  style="text-align:center; background:#"
| 2023-05-05 || || align=left| Diandra Martin || ONE Fight Night 10 || Broomfield, Colorado, U.S. ||  ||  || 
|-
|-  style="text-align:center; background:#cfc"
| 2022-12-02 || Win || align=left| Amber Kitchen || ONE on Prime Video 5 || Manila, Philippines || Decision (Unanimous) || 3 || 3:00
|-
|-  style="text-align:center; background:#fbb"
| 2022-04-22 || Loss || align=left| Smilla Sundell || ONE 156: Eersel vs. Sadikovic || Kallang, Singapore || Decision (Unanimous) || 5 ||3:00 
|-
! style=background:white colspan=9 |
|-
|-  style="text-align:center; background:#cfc"
| 2021-09-03 || Win || align=left| Daniela López || ONE Championship: Empower || Kallang, Singapore || Decision (Unanimous) || 3 ||3:00 
|-
|-  style="text-align:center; background:#cfc"
| 2021-04-28 || Win || align=left| Ekaterina Vandaryeva || ONE Championship: Full Blast || Kallang, Singapore || Decision (Majority) || 3 ||3:00 
|-
|-  style="text-align:center; background:#cfc"
| 2021-02-26 || Win || align=left| Wondergirl Fairtex || ONE Championship: Fists Of Fury || Kallang, Singapore || Decision (Unanimous) || 3 ||3:00 
|-
| colspan=9 | Legend:    

|-  style="text-align:center; background:#cfc"
| 2019-07-13|| Win || align=left| Kendra McIntyre || Bad Intentions 3 || Ontario, California, U.S. || Decision (Unanimous) || 5 ||3:00 
|-
! style=background:white colspan=9 |
|-
|-  style="text-align:center; background:#cfc"
| 2019-03-09|| Win || align=left| Gabrielle Laktineh || WCK Cali 33: Bring the Heat 3 || Burbank, California, U.S. || Decision (Unanimous) || 5 ||3:00 
|-
! style=background:white colspan=9 |

|-  style="background:#"
| 2018-12-14 || ||align=left|  || 2018 IFMA Pan American Championship || Buenos Aires, Argentina || Decision || 3 || 2:00
|-  style="background:#cfc"
| 2018-09-15 || Win ||align=left| Taylor McClatchie || SheFights II: Fight Like A Girl, Tournament Finals|| Toronto, Canada || Decision (Unanimous)|| 3 || 2:00
|-
! style=background:white colspan=9 |
|-  style="background:#cfc"
| 2018-09-15 || Win ||align=left| Vanessa De Belen || SheFights II: Fight Like A Girl, Tournament Semifinals || Toronto, Canada || Decision (Unanimous)|| 3 || 2:00
|-  style="background:#fbb"
| 2018-04-30|| Loss ||align=left| Ashley Thiner || USMTO West 2018, Tournament Final || Burbank, California, U.S. || Decision (Split)|| 5 || 2:00
|-
! style=background:white colspan=9 |
|-  style="background:#cfc"
| 2018-04-26 || Win ||align=left| Victoria Seeberger || USMTO West 2018, Tournament Semifinals || Phoenix, Arizona, U.S. || Decision (Unanimous)|| 3 || 2:00
|-
|-  style="background:#cfc"
| 2018-02-03 || Win ||align=left| Shannah Gozo || Cali 26 - Bring The Heat 2 || Burbank, California, U.S.|| Decision (Unanimous)|| 5 || 2:00
|-
|-  style="background:#cfc"
| 2018-01-17|| Win ||align=left|  || TBA Classic || Phoenix, Arizona, U.S. || Decision (Unanimous)|| 3 || 2:00
|-
|-  style="background:#fbb"
| 2017-11-10 || Loss ||align=left| Amber Kitchen || Cali 25: The Mega Show 2 || Burbank, California, U.S. || Decision (Split)|| 5 || 2:00
|-
! style=background:white colspan=9 |
|-
|-  style="background:#fbb"
| 2017-10-07 || Loss ||align=left| Julia Perez || WCK: Proving Grounds || Burbank, California, U.S. || Decision (Split)|| 5 || 2:00
|-
! style=background:white colspan=9 |
|-
|-  style="background:#cfc"
| 2017-09-16 || Win ||align=left| Mandana Rafat  || Destiny 5 || Ontario, Canada || Decision || 3 || 2:00
|-
|-  style="background:#cfc"
| 2017-04-29 || Win ||align=left| Breanne Lagunas || Cali 20: Beast Mode || Burbank, California, U.S. || Decision (Unanimous)|| 5 || 2:00
|-
|-  style="background:#cfc"
| 2017-02-18 || Win ||align=left| Akari Wang  || Cali 19: Bring The Heat || Bell Gardens, California, U.S.|| Decision (Unanimous) || 3 || 2:00
|-
|-  style="background:#cfc"
| 2016-07-16 || Win ||align=left| Mikayla Barut  || IFS 22 || Anaheim, California, U.S. || Decision (Unanimous)|| 3 || 2:00
|-
|-  style="background:#cfc"
| 2016-03-11 || Win ||align=left| Taylor Mauldin  || Defiant Promotions: Muay Thai Fighting || Studio City, Los Angeles, U.S. || Decision (Split)|| 3 || 2:00
|-
| colspan=9 | Legend:

See also
 List of female kickboxers

References

1997 births
Living people
American Muay Thai practitioners
Female Muay Thai practitioners
American sportspeople of Filipino descent
ONE Championship kickboxers
21st-century American women